The Sebring Downtown Historic District is a U.S. historic district (designated as such on March 16, 1990) located in Sebring, Florida. The district is at Circle Drive and Ridgewood Drive from Mango Street to Magnolia Avenue. It contains 22 historic buildings.

References

External links

 Highlands County listings at National Register of Historic Places

National Register of Historic Places in Highlands County, Florida
Neoclassical architecture in Florida
Geography of Highlands County, Florida
Historic districts on the National Register of Historic Places in Florida
1990 establishments in Florida
Sebring, Florida